Tárkány Művek are a group of Hungarian traditional and jazz musicians from Budapest, Hungary. Their sound welds traditional Hungarian folk with classical music and avant garde jazz, more recently with reggae and rock.

About 
The band was founded in 2008 and led by Bálint Tárkány-Kovács. Tárkány Művek released its first album in May, 2010 and quickly became the one of the most popular and celebrated young folk bands of Hungary. The songs of the album "You Etched Your Face in Mine" (Arcomba az arcod vésted) have created a new musical language which can be easily described as the new pathway of Hungarian contemporary folk. Jazz given to Balkan tastes, chansons and folk songs have led to astonishing tunes. Musical themes are usually taken from traditional folk songs and the never heard instrumentation makes Tárkány Művek non-replaceable. This special sound in folk of dulcimer, saxophone, viola and bass are enriched with female vocals which make these folk tunes unforgettable.

Members 
2007-2015:
 Bálint Tárkány-Kovács - lyricist, songwriter, cymbalist
 Julianna Paár – singer
 Gergő Kováts - saxophone, tárogató, flute, wind instruments
 Endre Papp - Transylvanian and classical viola
 András Bognár - double bass, gardon
2015-today
 Bálint Tárkány-Kovács - lyricist, songwriter, cimbalom player
 Petra Kész - singer
 Pázmándi Gergely - saxophone
 Ádám Móser - accordion, bagpipe
 Dániel Arday - contrabass
 David Szegő - drums

Discography 
 Arcomba az arcod vésted/You Etched Your Face in Mine (2010)
 Címesincs (2013)
 Őszi vázlatok (Autumn sketch) feat. Mihály Dresch - Live concert (2014)
 Magyar konyha támad (Hungarian kitchen bites) (2017)

Main performances 
 2017 Cluj Napoca (RO)
 2016 Akvárium, Budapest
 2016 Double Rise Festival, Torockó (RO)
 2015 VOLT festival, Sopron (HU)
 2014 Budapest PARK, Budapest
 2014 MÜPA, Budapest
 2014 Kaláka Festival, Eger (HU)
 2013 Csíkszereda (RO)
 2013 SZIN, Szegedi Ifjúsági Napok festival, Szeged (HU)
 2013 Animation Film Festival of Kecskemét- Kecskemét (HU)
 2012 Bratislava (SK) - Warszava (PL) tour, Tárkány Művek
 2012 Palace of Arts, Budapest
 2012 A38 Ship, Budapest
 2011 Valley of Arts, Kapolcs (HU)
 2011 Millenaris, Budapest
 2011 Jazz and Worldmusic Festival, Nagykanizsa
 2011 Paloc Easter, Fulek (SK)
 2011 Hungarian Cavalcade, Warszava (PL)
 2011 Gyilkostoi sokadalom (RO)
 2011 POSZT - Pecs
 2010 Spring Festival, Budapest
 2010 A38 (ship), Budapest
 2009 SZIN, Szeged

External links
 Official website

Hungarian folk music groups